Wesley Pentland (1929 – 23 September 2007) was an Irish travel industry executive and unionist politician in Northern Ireland.

Career 
Pentland began his career at Portadown railway station, then owned and managed a series of travel agencies, in Belfast. He became President of ABTA (the Association of British Travel Agents) and Chairman of the Institute of Travel and Tourism in the 1980s.

Pentland was a regular preacher for the Salvation Army for more than fifty years. He was also active in the Democratic Unionist Party, and was elected to the Northern Ireland Assembly, 1982, from North Down.

References

1929 births
2007 deaths
Northern Ireland MPAs 1982–1986
Democratic Unionist Party politicians
Salvationists from Northern Ireland
20th-century Methodists